This list of the Paleozoic life of Tennessee contains the various prehistoric life-forms whose fossilized remains have been reported from within the US state of Tennessee and are between 538.8 and 252.17 million years of age.

A

 †Abatocrinus
 †Abatocrinus grandis
 †Acanthocrania
 †Acantholaminatus
 †Acantholaminatus multistylus
 †Acantholaminatus typicus
 †Acodus
 †Actinoceras
 †Actinoceras capitolinum
 †Actinoceras cuvieri
 †Actinoceras tenuifilum
  †Actinocrinites
 †Adinocrinus
  †Agaricocrinus
   †Agaricocrinus americanus
 †Agaricocrinus crassus
 †Agassizocrinus
 †Agassizocrinus dissimilis
 †Agelacrinus
 †Agelacrinus cincinnatiensis
 †Alaskadiscus
 †Alaskadiscus cristatus
 †Alaskadiscus subacutus
 †Allagecrinida
 †Alloprosallocrinus
 †Alloprosallocrinus conicus
 †Allosaccus
 †Ambonychia
 †Ambonychia intermedius
 †Ammodiscella
 †Amphilichas
 †Amphilichas halli
 †Amphipsalidiocrinus
 †Amplexizaphrentis
  †Amplexopora
 †Amplexopora ampla
 †Amplexopora columbiana
 †Amplexopora convoluta
 †Amplexopora cylindracea
 †Amplexopora filiasa
 †Amplexopora petasiformis
 †Amplexus
 †Ampyx
 †Ampyxina
 †Anaphragma
 †Anaphragma hermitagensis
 †Anaphragma mirabile
 †Anastrophia
 †Anastrophia internascens
 †Anastrophia verneuili
 †Anazyga
 †Anazyga recurvirostra
 †Ancistrorhyncha
 †Ancistrorhyncha costata
 †Anisopleurella
 †Anolotichia
 †Anolotichia explanata
 †Anolotichia ponderosa
 †Anopliopsis
 †Anoplotheca
 †Anoplotheca concava
 †Aphelaspis
 †Aphelaspis walcotti – type locality for species
  †Aphetoceras
 †Aphetoceras oderi
 †Apodasmocrinus
 †Apopliopsis
 †Archinacella
 †Archinacella patelliformis
 †Arthroclema
 †Arthroclema striatum
 †Astraeospongium
 †Astreptodictya
 †Astylospongia
 †Astylospongia praemorsa
 †Atactoporella
 †Atactoporella insueta
 †Atactoporella mundula
 †Atactoporella typicalis
 †Atelelasma
 †Atelestocrinus
 †Athrophragma
 †Atrypa
  †Atrypa reticularis – report made of unidentified related form or using admittedly obsolete nomenclature
 †Atrypina
 †Atrypina disparilis
 †Atrypina imbricata
 †Aulacella
  †Aulopora
 †Aulopora trentonensis
 †Auloporella
 †Austinella
 †Austinella kankakensis
 †Australosutura
 †Avaoceras
 †Avaoceras wellsense

B

 Bairdia
 †Barycrinus
 †Barycrinus rhombiferus
 †Barycrinus sculptus
 †Barycrinus spurius
 †Barycrinus stellatus
 †Batherocystis
 †Batherocystis appressa
 †Bathyurus
 †Bathyurus extans
 †Batostoma
 †Batostoma confertum
 †Batostoma dendroidea
 †Batostoma fertile
 †Batostoma inutile
 †Batostoma libana
 †Batostoma minnesotensis
 †Batostoma ramosum
 †Batostoma subcrassum
 †Batostomella
 †Batostomella subgracilis
  †Bellerophon
 †Belodella
 †Belodella silurica
 †Belodina
 †Bembexia
 †Bergaueria
 †Billingsaria
 †Billingsites
 †Billingsites williamsportensis – tentative report
 †Bimuria
 †Bimuria superba
 †Botryocrinus
 †Botryocrinus polyxa
 †Bouskacrinus
 †Bouskacrinus waldronensis
 †Brachymetopus
 †Brachyprion
 †Brachyprion purduei
 †Breyeria
 †Breyeria rappi – type locality for species
 †Bucania
 †Bucanospira – type locality for genus
 †Bucanospira expansa – type locality for species
  †Bumastus
 †Buskopora
 †Byssonychia
 †Byssonychia radiata
 †Bythopora
 †Bythopora dendrina
 †Bythopora gracilis
 †Bythopora laxta

C

 Calloporina
 †Calloporina parva
 †Calopora
  †Calymene
  †Calymene niagarensis
 †Calyptaulax
 †Camarotoechia
 †Camerella
 †Carinaropsis
 †Carinaropsis cunulae
 †Cartersoceras – type locality for genus
 †Cartersoceras shideleri – type locality for species
 †Caryocrinites
 †Caryocrinites persculptus
 †Cataschisma
 †Cataschisma convexum
 †Catillocrinus
 †Catillocrinus tennesseeae
 †Catoraphiceras
 †Catoraphiceras lobatum
 †Ceramoporella
 †Ceramoporella grandis
 †Ceramoporella ingenua
 †Ceramoporella ohioensis
 †Ceramoporella whitei
 †Ceratopea
 †Ceratopea grandis
 †Ceratopsis
 †Ceratopsis intermedia
 †Ceraurinus
 †Ceraurinus scofieldi
  †Ceraurus
 †Ceraurus milleranus
 †Ceraurus pleurexanthemus – or unidentified comparable form
 †Cestites
 †Cestites mirabilis
 †Champlainopora – tentative report
 †Chasmataspis
 †Chasmataspis laurencii
 †Chasmatopora
 †Chasmatopora sublaxa
 †Chaulistomella
 †Chaulistomella ridleyensis
 †Chazydictya – tentative report
  †Cheirurus
 †Cheirurus niagarensis
 †Chepultapecia
 †Chepultapecia leiosomella
 †Chonetes
 †Chonetes glenparkensis – or unidentified related form
 †Christiania
  †Cincinnetina
 †Cincinnetina meeki
  †Cladochonus
 †Cladochonus amplexus
 †Cladochonus crassus
 †Cleiocrinus
 †Cleiocrinus tessallatus
  †Cleiothyridina
 †Cliophorus
 †Cliophorus fabula
 †Clisospira
 †Coeloclema
 †Coeloclema consimile
 †Coeloclema inflatum
 †Coeloclema pierceanum
 †Colaptomena
 †Colaptomena obesa
 †Columbicrinus
 †Columbicrinus crassus
 †Columnaria
 †Columnaria alveolata
 †Columnaria crenulata
 †Columnaria halli
 †Columnaria stellata
 †Coniculospongia
 †Coniculospongia radiata
 †Conocardium
 †Conotreta
  †Constellaria
 †Constellaria emaciata
 †Constellaria fischeri
 †Constellaria florida
 †Constellaria lamellosa
 †Constellaria polystomella
 †Constellaria teres
 †Constellaria varia
 †Coolinia
 †Coolinia subplana
 †Coopericystis – type locality for genus
 †Coopericystis pyriformis – type locality for species
  †Cornulites
 †Cornulites minor
 †Cornulites proprius
 †Coronocystis
 †Corynotrypa
 †Corynotrypa delicatula
 †Corynotrypa inflata
 †Corynotrypa tennesseensis
 †Corynotrypa turgida
 †Costalocrinus
 †Costalocrinus cornutus
 Crania
 †Crania laelia
 †Craniops
 †Crepicephalus
 †Crepicephalus comus
 †Crepicephalus thoosa
 †Crepipora
 †Crepipora hemispherica
 †Crepipora simulans
 †Crurithyris
 †Crurithyris parva
  †Cruziana
 †Ctenobolbina
 †Ctenobolbina subcrassa
 †Ctenodonta
 †Ctenodonta gibberula
 †Ctenodonta hartsvillensis
 †Ctenodonta hermitagenesis
 †Ctenodonta hermitagensis
 †Ctenodonta obliqua
 †Ctenodonta subrotunda
 †Ctenostoma
 †Cuneamya
 †Cupulocorona
 †Cupulocorona gemmiformis
 †Cupulocorona tennesseensis
 †Cyatbaxonia
 †Cyatbaxonia tantilla
 †Cyathaxonia
  †Cyathocrinites
 †Cyathocrinites farleyi
 †Cyathocrinites iowensis
 †Cycloholcus – type locality for genus
 †Cycloholcus nummus – type locality for species
 †Cyclonema
 †Cyclonema bilix
 †Cyclonema fluctuatum
 †Cyclonema mediale
 †Cyclonema minuta
 †Cyclonema praecipitum – type locality for species
 †Cyclonema varicosum
 †Cyclora
 †Cyclora pulcella
  †Cyphaspis
 †Cyphaspis christyi
 †Cyphotrypa
 †Cyphotrypa acervulosa
 †Cyphotrypa frankfortensis – or unidentified comparable form
 †Cypricardinia
 †Cypricardinia alta
 †Cyrtina
 †Cyrtina burlingtonensis
  †Cyrtoceras
 †Cyrtoceras convidale
 †Cyrtoceras stonense – tentative report
 †Cyrtoceras vallandighami
 †Cyrtodonta
 †Cyrtodonta grandis
 †Cyrtodonta huronensis
 †Cyrtodonta saffordi
 †Cyrtodontula
 †Cyrtolites
 †Cyrtolites inornatum
 †Cyrtolites ornatus
 †Cyrtolites retrorsus
 †Cyrtonella
 †Cyrtonotella
 †Cyrtospira
 †Cyrtospira tortilis – type locality for species
 †Cyrtostropha
 †Cyrtostropha salteri
 †Cystodictya

D

 †Dactylogonia
 †Dactylogonia incrassata
 †Dalejina
 †Dalejina hybrida – report made of unidentified related form or using admittedly obsolete nomenclature
 †Dalejina newsomensis
 †Dalmanella
 †Dalmanella bassleri – or unidentified comparable form
 †Dalmanella eminens
 †Dalmanella fertilis
 †Dalmanella jugosa
 †Dalmanella subcarinata
 †Dalmanella tersa
   †Dalmanites
 †Dalmanites retusus
 †Dalmanites verrucosus
 †Dalmanites vigilans
 †Dapsilodus
 †Dapsilodus obliquicostatus
 †Dapsilodus praecipuus
 †Dapsilodus sparsus
 †Dasyporella
 †Dawsonoceras
 †Decaschisma
 †Decaschisma lorae
 †Decaschisma pulchellum
 †Deceptrix
 †Decoriconus
 †Decoriconus fragilis
 †Dekayella
 †Dekayella foliacea
 †Dekayella praenuntia
 †Dekayella ridleyana
 †Dekayella trentonensis
 †Dekayella ulrichi
 †Deliablastus
 †Deliablastus cumberlandensis
 †Delthyris
 †Delthyris perlamellosa
 †Dendrocrinus
 †Dermatostroma
 †Dermatostroma cavernosum
 †Dermatostroma scabra
 †Dermatostroma tyronensis
 †Diabolirhynchia
 †Diabolirhynchia acinus
 †Dianulites
 †Dianulites petropolitanus – or unidentified comparable form
 †Diceromyonia
 †Diceromyonia tersa
 †Dichocrinus
 †Dicoelosia
 †Dicoelosia varica
 †Dicranopora
 †Dicranopora fragilis
 †Dielasma
 †Dimerocrinites
 †Dimerocrinites carleyi
 †Dimerocrinites inornatus
 †Dimerocrinites occidentalis
 †Dimorphichnus
 †Dinorthis
 †Dinorthis carleyi
 †Dinorthis pectinella
 †Dinorthis proavita
 †Dinorthis retrorsa
 †Diploclema
 †Diplotrypa
 †Diplotrypa catenulata
 †Diplotrypa dubia
 †Distomodus
 †Distomodus staurognathoides
 †Dolatocrinus
 †Dolatocrinus helderbergianus
 †Doleroides
 †Dolichoharpes
 †Doraclatum
 †Doraclotum
 †Dorytreta
 †Douglasocaris
 †Douglasocaris collinsi
 †Drepanella
 †Drepanella ampla
 †Drepanella elongata
 †Drepanella macra
 †Dunderbergia – tentative report
 †Dystactospongia
 †Dystactospongia insolens
 †Dystactospongia minor

E

 †Eatonia
 †Eatonia tennesseensis
  †Echinosphaerites
 †Ectenoglossa
 †Ectomaria
 †Ectomaria adventa – type locality for species
 †Ectomaria prisca
 †Edriocrinus
 †Elliptoglossa
 †Endocycloceras
 †Endocycloceras perannulatum
 †Enterolasma
 †Enterolasma strictum
 †Eodictyonella (formerly Dictyonella)
 †Eodictyonella gibbosa
 †Eodictyonella reticulata
 †Eohalysiocrinus
 †Eohalysiocrinus stigmatus
 †Eohalysiocrinus type locality for species 1 – informal
 †Eohalysiocrinus type locality for species 2 – informal
 †Eoleperditia
 †Eoplectodonta
 †Eospirifer
 †Eospirifer radiatus
 †Eotomaria
 †Eotomaria canalifera
 †Eotomaria dryope
 †Eotomaria labiosa
 †Eremotrema
  †Eretmocrinus
 †Eretmocrinus magnificus
 †Eridotrypa
 †Eridotrypa aedilis
 †Eridotrypa briareus
 †Eridotrypa mutabilis
 †Escharopora
 †Escharopora angularis
 †Escharopora briareus
 †Escharopora confluens
 †Escharopora falciformis
 †Escharopora libana
 †Escharopora maculata – or unidentified comparable form
 †Escharopora pavonia
 †Escharopora ramosa
 †Escharopora subramosa
 †Escharopora subrecta
   †Eucalyptocrinites
 †Eucalyptocrinites caelatus
 †Eucalyptocrinites crassus
 †Eucladocrinus
 †Eucladocrinus millebrachiatus
 †Eumorphocystis – tentative report
 †Eunema
 †Eunema centralis
 †Euomphalopsis
 †Euomphalopsis involuta
 †Eurychilina
 †Eurychilina aequalis
 †Eurychilina subradiata
 †Eurydictya
 †Euryoblastus
 †Euryoblastus veryi
 †Eutrochoceras

F

 †Fascifera
 †Fascifera stonensis
 †Favistella
 †Favositella
 †Favositella epidermata
 †Favosites
 †Favosites conicus
 †Favosites forbesi
 †Favosites spinigerus
 †Fenestella
 †Fletcheria
 †Fletcheria incerta
  †Flexicalymene
 †Flexicalymene meeki
 †Flexicalymene senaria
 †Foerstecystis
 †Foerstecystis obliqua
 †Foerstephyllum
 †Foerstia
 †Foerstia ohioensis
  †Forbesiocrinus
 †Forbesiocrinus wortheni

G

 †Gasconadia
 †Gasconadia putilla
 †Gaulocrinus
 †Gaulocrinus bordeni
 †Gaulocrinus veryi
 †Geniculifera
 †Geraocrinus
 †Geraocrinus sculptus
  †Gilbertsocrinus
 †Gilbertsocrinus tuberosus
 †Ginkgospongia
 †Ginkgospongia foliata
 †Girvanella
 †Glyphaspis – tentative report
  †Glyptocrinus
 †Glyptocrinus decadactylus
 †Glyptocrinus subglobosus
 †Glyptograptus
 †Glyptorthis
 †Glyptorthis assimilis
 †Glyptorthis bellarugosa
 †Glyptorthis insculpta
 †Glyptorthis irregularis – type locality for species
 †Glyptorthis maquoketensis
 †Gonioceras
 †Gonioceras anceps
 †Gonioceras occidentale
 †Goniotrypa
 †Goniotrypa bilateralis
 †Graphiadactyllis
 †Graphiadactyllis lineata
 †Graptodicta
 †Graptodicta fruticosa
 †Graptodictya
 †Graptodictya dendroidea
 †Graptodictya provia
  †Gravicalymene
  †Grewingkia
 †Grewingkia canadensis
 †Griffithidella
 †Grifithidella
 †Gypidula

H

 †Hadroblastus
 †Hagnocrinus
 †Hagnocrinus crenus – type locality for species
   †Hallopora
 †Hallopora angularis
 †Hallopora dalei
 †Hallopora dumalis
 †Hallopora florencia
 †Hallopora multitabulata
 †Hallopora onealli
 †Hallopora pulchella
 †Hallopora ramosa
 †Hallopora rugosa
 †Hallopora spissata
 †Halysiocrinus
 †Halysiocrinus cumberlandensis
 †Halysiocrinus tunicatus
 †Haplistion
 †Haplistion lobatum
 †Hebertella
 †Hebertella frankfortensis
 †Hebertella occidentalis
 †Hebertella sinuata
 †Hedeina
 †Hedeina eudora
 †Hedstroemia
  †Helcionopsis
  †Helcionopsis striata
 †Helicelasma
 †Helicelasma rusticum
 †Helicotoma
 †Helicotoma declivis
 †Helicotoma granosa
 †Helicotoma planulatoides
 †Helicotoma subquadrata
 †Helicotoma tennesseensis
 †Helopora
 †Helopora spiniformis
 †Hemidictya
 †Hemidictya lebanonensis
 †Hemiphragma
 †Hemiphragma irrasum
 †Hemiphragma ottawaensis
 †Hesperorthis
 †Hesperorthis australis
 †Hesperorthis tricenaria
 †Heterorthis
 †Heterorthis clytie
 †Heterospongia
 †Heterospongia subramosa
 †Heterotrypa
 †Heterotrypa echinata
 †Heterotrypa exovaria
 †Heterotrypa frondosa
 †Heterotrypa magnopora
 †Heterotrypa parulipora
 †Heterotrypa parvulipora
 †Heterotrypa patera
 †Heterotrypa praenuntia
 †Heterotrypa rugosa
 †Heterotrypa simplex
 †Heterotrypa solitaria
 †Heterotrypa stonensis
 †Heterotrypa subpulchella
 †Heterotrypa subramosa
 †Heterotrypa subtrentonensis
 †Heterotrypa tuberculata
 †Hexacrinites
 †Hibbertia
 †Hindia
 †Hindia parva
 †Hindia sphaeroidalis
 †Hiscobeccus
 †Hiscobeccus capax
  †Holopea
 †Homoeospira
 †Homoeospira evax
 †Homotrypa
 †Homotrypa arbuscula
 †Homotrypa callosa
 †Homotrypa centralis
 †Homotrypa curvata
 †Homotrypa flabellaris
 †Homotrypa grandis
 †Homotrypa minnesotensis
 †Homotrypa similis
 †Homotrypa subramosa
 †Homotrypa tabulata
 †Homotrypa tuberculata
 †Homotrypella
 †Homotrypella hospitalis
 †Homotrypella nodosa
 †Hormotoma
 †Hormotoma columbiana
 †Hormotoma gracilis
 †Howellella
 †Howellella crispa – or unidentified comparable form
 †Hudsonaster
 †Hudsonaster narrowayi
 †Hustedia
 
  †Hyolithes
 †Hyolithes newsomensis

I

  †Illaenus
 †Ischadites
 †Ischadites turbinatus – or unidentified comparable form
 †Isochilina
 †Isochilina ampla
 †Isochilina columbiana
 †Isochilina jonesi
 †Isochilina saffordi
 †Isophragma
 †Isophragma extensum
 †Isophragma subabbreviatum – type locality for species
 †Isorthis
 †Isorthis pygmaea
  †Isotelus

K

 †Kallimorphocrinus
 †Kallimorrhocrinus
 †Kirkbya
 †Kirkbya fernglepensis
 †Kirkbyella
 †Kloedenia
 †Kloedenia praenuntia
 †Kockelella
 †Kockelella amsdeni
 †Kockelella ortus
 †Kockelella ranuliformis
 †Kockelella stauros
 †Kockelella variabilis
 †Kockelella walliseri
 †Krausella
 †Krausella arcuata

L

 †Labriproductus – tentative report
 †Lambeophyllum
 †Lambeophyllum profundum
 †Lampadosocrinus
 †Lampterocrinus
 †Leangella
 †Leangella tennesseensis
 †Lecanocrinus
 †Lecanocrinus pusilla
 †Lecanocrinus pusillus
 †Leiochonetes
 †Leperditella
 †Leperditella tumida
 †Leperditia
 †Leperditia appressa
 †Leperditia appresso
 †Leperditia columbiana
 †Leperditia fabulites
 †Leperditia pondi
 †Leperditia tumidula
 †Lepidocoleus
 †Lepidocyclus
 †Lepidocyclus manniensis
 †Leptaena
 †Leptaena moniquensis
 †Leptaena rhomboidalis
 †Leptaena richmondensis
 †Leptaenisca
 †Leptaenisca concava
 †Leptellina
 †Leptostrophia
 †Lichenaria
 †Lichenaria carterensis
 †Lichenaria globularis
 †Lichenaria grandis
 †Lichenaria parva
 †Licrophycus
 †Licrophycus libana
 †Lingulasma
 †Lingulasma matutinum – type locality for species
  †Lingulella
 †Lingulops
 †Lingulops cliftonensis
 †Lingulops norwoodi
 †Lioclemella
 †Lioclemella bifurcata
 †Liospira
 †Liospira americana
 †Liospira decipens
 †Liospira progne
 †Liospira subconcava
 †Liospira vitruvia
 †Lissatrypa – tentative report
 †Lobomelocrinus
 †Lobomelocrinus obconicus
 †Lobomelocrinus rugatus
   †Lonchodomas
 †Lophospira
 †Lophospira conoidea
 †Lophospira milleri
 †Lophospira obliqua
 †Lophospira perangulata – type locality for species
 †Lophospira producta
 †Lophospira selecta – type locality for species
 †Lophospira superba – type locality for species
 †Loxobucania
 †Loxobucania emmonsi
 †Loxobucania nashvillensis – type locality for species
 †Loxonema
 †Lyriocrinus
 †Lyriocrinus melissa
 †Lyrodesma
 †Lytospira
 †Lytospira undulatus

M

 †Maclurina
 †Maclurina bigsbyi
 †Macluritella
 †Macluritella uniangulata
 †Maclurites
 †Maclurites magnus
 †Maclurites nitidus
 †Macrocrinus
 †Macropleura
 †Macrostylocrinus
 †Macrostylocrinus fasciatus
 †Macrostylocrinus striatus
 †Magnuscrinus
 †Magnuscrinus kammeri
 †Magnuscrinus praegravis
 †Manespira
 †Manespira rotunda – type locality for species
 †Marginatia
 †Marsupiocrinus
 †Mauryella
 †Mauryella mammillata
 †Meekopora
 †Meekopora clausa – or unidentified comparable form
 †Megamyonia
 †Megamyonia unicostata
 †Meilsonia
 †Menoieidina
 †Merista
 †Merista nitida
  †Meristella
 †Meristella atoka
 †Meristina
 †Meristina maria
 †Meristina rectirostra
 †Mesotrypa
 †Mesotrypa angularis
 †Mesotrypa crustulata
 †Mesotrypa dubia
 †Mespilocrinus
 †Mespilocrinus romingeri
 †Metichthyocrinus
 †Metichthyocrinus clarkensis
 †Metichthyocrinus tiaraeformis
 †Metriophyllum
 †Metriophyllum deminutivum
 †Metriophyllum diminutivum
 †Michelinia
 †Michellinia
 †Mimella
 †Mimella borealis
 †Mitoclema
 †Mitoclema cinctosum
 †Modiolodon
 †Modiolodon ganti
 †Modiolodon oviformis
 †Modiolodon winchelli
 †Modiolopsis
 †Modiolopsis consimilis – tentative report
 †Modiolopsis modiolaris
 †Modiolopsis truncatus
 †Monomorphichnus
 †Monotrypa
 †Monticulipora
 †Monticulipora cincinnatiensis
 †Monticulipora compacta
 †Monticulipora discula
 †Monticulipora disicula
 †Monticulipora intersita
 †Monticulipora mammulata
 †Monticulipora molesta
 †Mulceodens
 †Multicostella
 †Multicostella plena – type locality for species
 †Myelodactylus

N

 †Nanillaenus
 †Nematopora
 †Nemtatopora
 †Newportopora
 †Newsomella
 †Newsomella revolutadivaricata
 †Newsomella ulrichi
 †Nicholsonella
 †Nicholsonella frondifera
 †Nicholsonella pulchra
 †Nicholsonella vaupeli – or unidentified comparable form
 †Nipterocrinus
 †Nipterocrinus monroensis
 †Nolichuckia
 †Nolichuckia casteri
 †Nucelospira
 †Nucelospira rowleyi
 †Nucleospira
 †Nucleospira pisiformis
 †Nucleospira rowleyi
 †Nucularca
 †Nucularca pectunculoides
 †Nuculopsis
 †Nyctopora

O

 †Oepikina
 †Omospira
 †Omospira laticincta
 †Onychoplecia
 †Ophileta
 †Ophileta supraplana
 †Ophiletina
 †Ophiletina sublaxa
 †Opikina
 †Opikina glabella
 †Opikina speciosa
 †Orbiculoidea
 †Orbiculoidea cellulosa
 †Orbignyella
 †Orbignyella multitabulata
 †Orbignyella nodosa
 †Orbignyella sublamellosa
 †Orbignyella wetherbyi
 †Orthambonites
  †Orthoceras
 †Orthodesma
 †Orthograptus
 †Orthorhynchula
 †Orthorhynchula linneyi
 †Orthostrophia
 †Orthostrophia strophomenoides
 †Ottoseetaxis
 †Ovatia
 †Ozarkodina
 †Ozarkodina bohemica
 †Ozarkodina confluens
 †Ozarkodina sagitta

P

 †Pachydicta
 †Pachydicta grandis
 †Pachydictya
 †Pachydictya foliata – or unidentified comparable form
 †Pachydictya senilis
 †Pachystrophia
 †Pachystrophia contiguus – type locality for species
  †Paciphacops
 †Paciphacops logani
 †Palaeacis
 †Palaeacis enormis
 †Palaeocrinus
 †Palaeocrinus sulcatus
 †Palaeophycus
 †Palaeostrophomena
 †Palaeostrophomena superba – type locality for species
 †Paleoalveolites
 †Panderodus
 †Panderodus panderi – tentative report
 †Panderodus unicostatus
 †Parachaetetes – tentative report
 †Paracyrtolites
 †Paracyrtolites subplanus
 †Paradichocrinus
 †Paradichocrinus planus
 †Paraliospira
 †Paraliospira abrupta – type locality for species
 †Parvohallopora
 †Parvohallopora granda
 †Parvohallopora pulchella
 †Passalocrinus
 †Passalocrinus triangularis
 †Paterula
 †Paterula perfecta
 †Paucicrura
 †Paucicrura quadrata
 †Paupospira
 †Paupospira bowdeni
 †Paupospira burginensis
 †Paupospira oweni
 †Paupospira sumnerensis
 †Paupospira tropidophora
 †Paurorthis
 †Paurorthis longa
  †Pentremites
 †Pentremites princetonensis
 †Pentremites pulchellus
 †Perimecocoelia
 †Peronopora
 †Peronopora compressa
 †Peronopora decipiens
 †Peronopora milleri
 †Peronopora mundula
 †Peronopora pavonia
 †Peronopora weirae
 †Petalichnus
 †Petigopora
 †Petigopora gregaria
 †Petigopora petechialis
 †Petrocrania
 †Petrocrania scabiosa
 †Phaenopora
 †Phanocrinus
 †Phanocrinus sagillatus – type locality for species
 †Pharetrolites
 †Phillibole
 †Phillibole conkini – or unidentified comparable form
 †Phimocrinus
 †Phragmolites
 †Phragmolites cellulosus
 †Phragmolites dyeri
 †Phragmolites triangularis – type locality for species
 †Phycodes
 †Phyllodictya
 †Phyllodictya frondosa
 †Phylloporina
 †Phylloporina clathrata
 †Phylloporina reticulata
 †Piltonia
 †Piltonia tennesseensis
 †Pionodema
 †Pionodema aberstadti – type locality for species
 †Pionodema minuscula
 †Pionodema subaequata
 †Pionomena
 †Pisocrinus
 †Pisocrinus gemmiformis
 †Pisocrinus quinquelobus
  †Plaesiomys
 †Plaesiomys bellistriatus
 †Plaesiomys proavitus
 †Plaesiomys subquadrata
  †Planolites
   †Platyceras – type locality for genus
 †Platyceras nelsoni – type locality for species
 †Platyceras niagarense
 †Platyceras plebium
 †Platyceras princeps – type locality for species
  †Platycrinites
 †Platycrinites hemisphaericus
 †Platycrinites saffordi
  †Platystrophia
 †Platystrophia acutilirata
 †Platystrophia amoena
 †Platystrophia colbiensis
 †Platystrophia crassa
 †Platystrophia cypha
 †Platystrophia elegantula
 †Platystrophia extensa
 †Platystrophia globosa
 †Platystrophia hermitagensis
 †Platystrophia juvenis
 †Platystrophia laticosta
 †Platystrophia nitida
 †Platystrophia ponderosa
 †Platystrophia precursor
 †Platystrophia strigosa
 †Platystrophia sublaticosta
 †Plectambonites
 †Plectambonites clarksvillensis
 †Plectambonites saxea
 †Plectambonites sericeus
 †Plectoceras
 †Plectoceras bondi
 †Plectorthis
 †Plectospira
  †Pleurodictyum
 †Pliomerops
 †Plumulites
 †Polydeltoideus
 †Polyplacognathus
 †Prasopora
 †Prasopora contigus
 †Prasopora falesi
 †Prasopora insularis
 †Prasopora nodosa
 †Prasopora patera
 †Prasopora simulatrix
 †Primitiella
 †Primitiella constricta
 †Prismostylus
 †Prismostylus fibratum
 Proboscina
 †Proboscina auloporoides
 †Proboscina frondosa
 †Productina
 †Productina sampsoni – tentative report
 †Proetides – tentative report
  †Proetus
 †Proetus parviusculus
 †Prokopicrinus
 †Prokopicrinus barricki
 †Protarea
 †Protarea richmondensis
 †Proteoceras
 †Proteoceras tyronensis
 †Protopanderodus
 †Protoryncha
 †Protoryncha ridleyana
 †Protosalvinia
 †Pseudobythocyoris
 †Pseudooneotodus
 †Pseudooneotodus bicornis
 †Pseudotythocyoris
 †Pterinea
 †Pterinea cincinnatiensis
 †Pterinea demissa
 †Pterotheca
 †Pterotheca saffordi
 †Pterotheca undulata
 †Pterygometopus
 †Pterygometopus carleyi
 †Pterygometopus troosti
 †Pterygometrus
 †Pterygometrus troosti
 †Ptilotrypa
 †Ptilotrypa obliquata
 †Ptychopleurella
 †Ptychopleurella bassleri
 †Punctospirifer
 †Punctospirifer subellipticus
 †Pygodus

Q

 †Quadratia

R

 †Rafinesquina
 †Rafinesquina alternata
 †Rafinesquina hermitagensis
 †Rafinesquina ponderosa
 †Raphistoma
 †Raphistoma striatum
 †Raphistomina
 †Raphistomina lapicida
 †Raphistomina modesta
 †Renalcis
 †Resserella
 †Resserella elegantula
 †Retrorsirostra
 †Retrorsirostra carleyi
 †Rhabdocrinus
 †Rhinidictya
 †Rhinidictya basalis
 †Rhinidictya lebanonensis
 †Rhinidictya nashvillensis
 †Rhinidictya nicholsoni
 †Rhinidictya salemensis
 †Rhinidictya tabulata
 †Rhinidictya trentonensis
 †Rhipidomella
 †Rhipidomella emarginata
 †Rhipidomelloides
 †Rhipidomelloides oblata
 †Rhipidomena
 †Rhombopora
 †Rhombotrypa
 †Rhombotrypa quadrata
 †Rhychotrema
 †Rhychotrema increbescens
 †Rhynchocamera
 †Rhynchocamera varians
 †Rhynchopora
 †Rhynchospirina
 †Rhynchospirina formosa
 †Rhynchotrema
 †Rhynchotrema dentatum
 †Rhynchotrema increbescens
 †Rhynchotrema perlamellosum
 †Rhynchotreta
 †Rhynchotreta americana
 †Rhytiophora
 †Robergia
 Rostricellula
 †Rostricellula orientalis
 †Rugosochonetes
  †Rusophycus

S

 †Saccocrinus
 †Saccocrinus christyi
 †Saccospongia
 †Saccospongia danvillensis
 †Saccospongia laxata
 †Saffordotaxis
 †Saffordotaxis incrassatus – or unidentified comparable form
  †Sagenocrinites
  †Salterella
 †Salterella billingsi
 †Schizambon
 †Schizolopha – type locality for genus
 †Schizolopha textilis – type locality for species
 †Schizopea
 †Schizopea grandis
 †Schuchertella
 †Schuchertella louisianensis
 †Schuchertocystis
 †Schuchertocystis radiata
 †Scolithos
 †Scolithos columbiana
 †Scyphocrinites
 †Septopora
 †Sievertsia
 †Sinuopea
 †Sinuopea basiplanata
 †Siphonotreta
 †Siphonotreta americana – type locality for species
 †Skenidioides
 †Skenidium
 †Skenidium anthonense
 †Skenidium halli
   †Skolithos
  †Solenopora
 †Solenopora compacta
 †Sowerbyella
 †Sowerbyella lebanonensis
 †Sowerbyella varicostellata – type locality for species
 †Sphaerirhynchia
 †Sphaerirhynchia stricklandi
  †Sphaerocodium – tentative report
 †Sphaerocyclus – report made of unidentified related form or using admittedly obsolete nomenclature
 †Sphaerocyclus tuber
 †Sphenosphaera
 †Sphenosphaera capax
 †Sphenosphaera rogersensis
 †Sphenosphaera troosti
  †Spirifer
 †Spirifer shephardi – or unidentified related form
 †Spirifer vernonensis – or unidentified related form
  Spirorbis
 †Springerocystis
 †Springerocystis longicallis
 †Spyroceras
 †Spyroceras bilineatum
 †Stegerhynchus
 †Stegerhynchus indianensis
 †Stegerhynchus whitei
 †Stegerhynchus whitii
 †Stellipora
 †Stellipora stipata
 †Stenoporida
 †Stereocrinus
 †Stictopora
 †Stictoporella
 †Stictoporella angularis
 †Stictoporella cribrilina
 †Stigmatella
 †Stigmatella distinctaspinosa
 †Stiodermiella
 †Stiodermiella amanita
 †Stiodermiella tetragona
 †Stiptocrinus
 †Straparollina
 †Straparollina cassina – type locality for species
 †Straparollus
 †Streblochondria
 †Streblopteria
 †Streblotrypa
 †Streptaster
 †Streptaster vorticellatus
 †Streptelasma
 †Streptelasma corniculum – or unidentified comparable form
 †Streptelasma parisiticum – tentative report
 †Striatopora
 †Strictoporella
 †Strictoporella cribilina
 †Striispirifer
 †Stromatocerium
 †Stromatocerium huronensis
 †Stromatocerium pustulosum
 †Stromatocerium rugosum – or unidentified comparable form
 †Stromatopora
 †Stromatopora arachnoidea
 †Stromatotrypa
 †Stromatotrypa incrusans
 †Stromatotrypa lamellata
 †Stromatotrypa regularis
 †Strophalosia – tentative report
   †Strophomena
 †Strophomena concordensis
 †Strophomena filitexta
 †Strophomena incurvata
 †Strophomena neglecta
 †Strophomena odessae
 †Strophomena planoconvexa
 †Strophomena planodorsata
 †Strophomena planumbona
 †Strophomena sinuata
 †Strophomena subtenta
 †Strophomena vicina
 †Strophonella
 †Strophonella lineolata
 †Strophonella semifasciata
 †Strophopleura
 †Strophostylus
 †Strophostylus cyclostomus
 †Subulites
 †Subulites nanus
 †Subulites regularis
 †Synbathocrinus
 †Synbathocrinus swallovi

T

 †Talarocrinus
 †Talarocrinus inflatus
 †Talarocrinus trijugis
 †Talasotreta – tentative report
 †Talasotreta alta – type locality for species
 †Tarphophragma
 †Tarphophragma ampla
 †Tarphophragma multitabulata
  †Taxocrinus
   †Tentaculites
 †Tentaculites obliquus
 †Tetradella
 †Tetradella quadrilirata
 †Tetradium
 †Tetradium carterensis
 †Tetradium cellulosum
 †Tetradium columnare
 †Tetradium laxum
 †Tetradium minus
 †Tetradium syringoporoides
 †Tetradium ulrichi
 †Tetranota
 †Tetranota bidorsata
 †Tetranota sexcarinata
 †Tetrasacculus
 †Tetrasacculus stewartae
 †Thaerodonta
 †Thaerodonta recedens
 †Thalamocrinus
 †Thamniscus
 †Theloreus
 †Thinocrinus
 †Thinocrinus lowei
 Thurammina
 †Titanambonites
 †Titanambonites amplus
 †Tolypammina
 †Trematis
 †Trematospira
 †Trepospira
  †Tricrepicephalus
 †Tricrepicephalus walcotti
 †Trigonodictya
 †Trigonodictya irregularis
 †Trimerus
 †Trimerus delphinocephalus
 †Triplesia
 †Triplesia putillus
 †Trochonema
 †Trochonema bellulum
 †Trochonema eccentricum
 †Trochonema trochonemoides – type locality for species
 †Trochonema umbilicata
 †Trochonemella – tentative report
 †Trochonemella knoxvillensis – type locality for species
 †Trochonemella notablis – type locality for species
 †Trochophyllum
 †Trochophyllum verneuili
 †Trophocrinus
 †Twenhofelella
 †Twenhofelella bulbulus
 †Tyrridiocystis

U

 †Ulrichocystis
 †Ulrichocystis eximia
 †Uncinulus
 †Uncinulus swaynensis
 †Uncinulus vellicatus
 †Undulabucania
 †Undulabucania punctifrons
 †Uperocrinus
 †Uperocrinus apheles
 †Uperocrinus nashvillae
 †Uperocrinus robustus

V

 †Valcourea
 †Valcourea deflecta
 †Vanuxemia
 †Vanuxemia hayniana
 †Vermiporella

W

 †Walliserodus
 †Walliserodus sancticlairi
 †Westonia
 †Whiteavesia
 †Whiteavesia saffordi
 †Whitfieldella
 †Whitfieldella nitida
 †Wurmiella
 †Wurmiella excavata

X

 †Xyeleblastus
 †Xyeleblastus magnificus

Z

 †Zittelella
 †Zittelella varians
 †Zophocrinus
 †Zygospira
 †Zygospira lebanonensis – type locality for species
 †Zygospira modesta
 †Zygospira saffordi

References
 

Paleozoic
Tennessee